The periodatonickelates are a series of anions and salts of nickel complexed to the periodate anion. The diperiodatonickelates with nickel in the +4 oxidation state are powerful oxidising agents that are capable of oxidising bromate to perbromate.

Sodium nickel periodate, NaNiIO6·0.5H2O and potassium nickel periodate, KNiIO6·0.5H2O were discovered in 1949 by P. Ray and B. Sarma. These double salts are coloured dark purple. The salts were made by oxidising nickel sulfate mixed with potassium periodate (or sodium periodate) with the alkali persulfate salt in boiling water. Similar solids exist for other alkalis such as RbNiIO6·0.5H2O ,CsNiIO6·0.5H2O and NH4NiIO6·0.5H2O. The crystalline salts are insoluble in water, acids or bases. Ozone can also be used as the oxidiser. The colour is due to absorbance of visible light shorter than 800 nm, with a peak at 540 nm.  The crystal structure of all the solids has space group P312.  It contains layers of hexagon arrangements of oxygen, in every second layer the alkali atoms fill one third of the holes, and in the alternative layers iodine and nickel fill two thirds of the holes. Analogous mixed periodates also exist for some other tetravalent metals, including manganese, germanium, tin and lead.

The diperiodatonickelates, also known as dihydroxydiperiodatonickelates, contain nickel in the +4 oxidation state along with two periodate anions. The [Ni(OH)2[IO5OH]2]6− ion can form a brown salt with sodium: Na4H2[Ni(OH)2[IO5OH]2]·6H2O, another acidic sodium salt Na5[Ni(OH)2[IO5OH]2]·H2O and another orange salt with cobalt: [Co(ethylenediamine)3]2Ni(OH)2[IO5OH]2. Diperiodatometalates with the same formula also exist for palladium and nickel. Similar diperiodatometalates can also be made for Cu, Ag, Au, Ru and Os. Diperiodatonickelate is a strong oxidiser. It can dissolve in water in alkaline conditions. An equilibrium between several ions is produced, depending on pH and concentration: [Ni(OH)2[IO3(OH)3]2]2−, [Ni(OH)2[IO3(OH)3][IO4(OH)2]]3−. The ability to oxidise bromate to perbromate is unusual, and very few reagents can do this. The reaction occurs by Ni(IV) changing to Ni(III) with the release of hydroxyl radical which can react with bromate. Ni(III) converts BrO42− radical to perbromate BrO4−. A solid monoperiodatonickelate salt KNiIO6·0.5H2O dissolves in a potassium hydroxide and potassium periodate solution to yield diperiodatonickelate in solution.

References

Periodates
Nickel complexes
Oxidizing agents